Troubky-Zdislavice is a municipality in Kroměříž District in the Zlín Region of the Czech Republic. It has about 400 inhabitants.

Administrative parts

The municipality is made up of villages of Troubky and Zdislavice.

Geography
It lies in a hllia and mainly agricultural landscape in the Litenčice Hills. The Olšinka stream flows through the municipality.

History
The first written mention of Troubky is from 1281 and of Zdislavice (Zdislawitz) is from 1349. For centuries, Troubky was divided into two parts, one held by the local Lords of Zdounky and the second by the bishops of Olomouc. Zdislavice often changed owners and was held by a hundred of various lower nobles. The almost last of them and one of the most notable owners was the Dubský family.

The two villages were merged or unofficially administered together several times in their history. The modern municipality was formed by the merger of the separate municipalities of Troubky and Zdislavice in 1960.

Sights

The Zdislavice Castle was built as a Baroque palace in the late 17th century on the site of a former stone fortress. In the 1840s, it was rebuilt to its current Empire style form by Count Dubský. The castle includes a park with the Dubský family tomb. The castle, which has been dilapidated for a long time, is today privately owned and gradually being repaired.

In popular culture
The film Requiem pro panenku was shot here.

Notable people
Marie von Ebner-Eschenbach (1830–1916), Austrian writer

References

External links

 

Villages in Kroměříž District